Hal is the eponymous debut of Irish band Hal, released by Rough Trade Records on May 10, 2005.

Track listing
"What a Lovely Dance" (Allen, Mullan, O'Brien)
"Play the Hits" (Allen, O'Brien)
"Keep Love as Your Golden Rule" (Allen, Mullan, O'Brien)
"Don't Come Running" (Allen, Mullan, O'Brien)
"I Sat Down" (Allen, O'Brien)
"My Eyes Are Sore" (Allen, Mullan, O'Brien)
"Fools by Your Side" (Allen, Mullan, O'Brien)
"Worry About the Wind" (Allen, O'Brien)
"Satisfied" (Allen, O'Brien)
"Slowdown (You've Got a Friend)" (Allen, O'Brien)
"Coming Right Over" (Allen, O'Brien)

References

2005 debut albums
Rough Trade Records albums
Albums produced by Ian Stanley
Albums produced by Edwyn Collins
European Border Breakers Award-winning albums